Tim Brooks (born April 18, 1942) is an American television and radio historian, author and retired television executive. He is credited with having helped launch the Sci Fi Channel in 1992 as well as other USA Network projects and channels.

He also served as a research executive for NBC, the N.W. Ayer advertising agency, and Lifetime Television, and as board chairman of industry organizations the Advertising Research Foundation and the Media Rating Council, among others.

He is the author or co-author of nine books about the history of media in the U.S., including television, radio, and the recording industry. He has also been active in urging reform of copyright laws regarding historical recordings, testifying at U.S. Copyright Office hearings in 2011 and chairing the Historical Recording Coalition for Access and Preservation. He was twice elected president of the Association for Recorded Sound Collections (serving 1982-84 and 2012–14) and has been chair of its Copyright and Fair Use Committee since 2003.

Comments made by Brooks regarding the Sci Fi Channel's name being changed in 2009 to Syfy led network president Dave Howe to publicly distance himself and his network from Brooks' comments.

Awards
Association for Recorded Sound Collections Award for Excellence for The Blackface Minstrel Show in Mass Media, 2020.
Lifetime Achievement Award from the Advertising Research Foundation in 2008.
Grammy Award for Lost Sounds CD, Best Historical Album, 2007. Also nominated for Best Album Notes in 2007 and 2021.
Society for American Music Irving Lowens Award for Distinguished Scholarship in American Music, for Lost Sounds, 2006.
ASCAP Deems Taylor Award for Lost Sounds, 2005.
Association for Recorded Sound Collections Award for Excellence for Lost Sounds, 2005. 
Lifetime Achievement Award from the Association for Recorded Sound Collections in 2004.
Association for Recorded Sound Collections Award for Excellence for The Columbia Master Book Discography, 2000.
The Complete Directory by Brooks and Marsh won a 1980 U.S. National Book Award in the one-year category General Reference (paperback).

Brooks was a member of the Peabody Awards Board of Jurors from 2007 to 2013.

Publications
The Complete Directory to Prime Time Network and Cable TV Shows, 1946-Present (1979), by Brooks and Earle Marsh
Lost Sounds: Blacks and the Birth of the Recording Industry, published in 2004 with a related double-CD by the same name which won a Grammy Award in 2007.
The Blackface Minstrel Show in Mass Media, (2020).
College Radio Days (2013).
Little Wonder Records and Bubble Books, with Merle Sprinzen (2011).
Survey of Reissues of U.S. Recordings, for the Council on Library and Information Resources and the Library of Congress (2005).
The Columbia Master Book Discography, 1901-1934, with Brian Rust (1999).
The Complete Directory to Prime Time TV Stars (1987).

Notes

References

External links
Tim Brooks Home Page

1945 births
Living people
American television executives
Historians of the United States
National Book Award winners
Discographers
20th-century American businesspeople